The 1986–87 NBA season was the Knicks' 41st season in the NBA.

With second-year center Patrick Ewing still struggling with injuries and after starting the season 4-12, head coach Hubie Brown was fired and Bob Hill took over for the rest of the season. Brown returned to coach the  Memphis Grizzlies in the 2002-03 season.

Draft picks

Roster

Regular season

Season standings

z - clinched division title
y - clinched division title
x - clinched playoff spot

Record vs. opponents

Game log

Player statistics

Season

Awards and records

Transactions

References

See also
1986-87 NBA season

New York Knicks seasons
New York Knick
New York Knicks
New York Knicks
1980s in Manhattan
Madison Square Garden